In mathematics, in the realm of group theory, a group is said to be critical if it is not in the variety generated by all its proper subquotients, which includes all its subgroups and all its quotients.

 Any finite monolithic A-group is critical. This result is due to Kovacs and Newman.
 The variety generated by a finite group has a finite number of nonisomorphic critical groups.

External links
 Definition of critical group

Properties of groups